Callimetopus siargoanus is a species of beetle in the family Cerambycidae. It was described by Schultze in 1919. It is known from the Philippines.

References

Callimetopus
Beetles described in 1919